Mandy Krauthamer Cohen is an American physician and public health official. From 2017 to 2021, she served as the secretary of the North Carolina Department of Health and Human Services. Prior to serving as Health Secretary, Cohen was the chief operating officer and chief of staff at the Centers for Medicare & Medicaid Services during the Obama Administration. She also served as the Deputy Director of Comprehensive Women's Health Services at the United States Department of Veterans Affairs and is a founding member and former executive director of Doctors for America. Cohen was listed as one of the Top 25 Women Leaders in Healthcare by Modern Healthcare in 2019.

Early life and education 
Cohen grew up on Long Island in the Baldwin hamlet in Hempstead, New York. Her mother worked as a nurse practitioner in emergency medicine, and inspired her to pursue a medical career. Cohen has a bachelor's degree in policy analysis and management from Cornell University. She received her medical degree from the Yale School of Medicine and has a graduate degree in public health from the Harvard T.H. Chan School of Public Health. She trained in internal medicine at Massachusetts General Hospital in Boston. In 2004, while a medical school student, she took up a position with the American College of Physicians on their National Council of Student Members. While in her residency, she served on Massachusetts General Hospital's committees for primary care, quality assurance, and recruitment. She later served as Co-Director for the Health Policy Elective at Massachusetts General Hospital and was a northeast representative for the American College of Physicians' National Council of Associates.

Career 
After completing her residency in Boston, Cohen moved to Washington, D.C., where she worked for the United States Department of Veterans Affairs as the Deputy Director of Comprehensive Women's Health Services.

In 2008 she was a founding member and National Outreach Director for the grassroots organization Doctors for Obama, later renamed Doctors for America. She served as the organization's policy director and later as executive director. On October 5, 2009, she and fifty of the organization's members met with President Barack Obama in the Oval Office, followed by a reception at the White House Rose Garden, for the White Coat Rally.

In 2013 she was hired as a senior advisor by the Centers for Medicare & Medicaid Services, a federal agency within the United States Department of Health and Human Services, to assist in implementing policies for Medicaid, Medicare, and the Children's Health Insurance Program, as well as the Federally Facilitated Marketplace under the Patient Protection and Affordable Care Act. She was later appointed as the Chief Operating Officer and Chief of Staff Services at the agency and served as Acting Director of the agency's Center for Consumer Information and Insurance Oversight. In 2014, while eight months pregnant, Cohen advocated for maternity coverage in the Affordable Care Act before Congress.

Cohen is an adjunct professor of health policy & management at the University of North Carolina at Chapel Hill's Gillings School of Global Public Health.

Secretary of North Carolina Department of Health and Human Services 
In January 2017 Cohen was appointed as secretary of the North Carolina Department of Health and Human Services (NCDHHS) by Governor Roy Cooper. As secretary, she oversees 16,000 department employees and has dealt with multiple health crises in North Carolina including the Opioid epidemic, GenX in drinking water, and the COVID-19 pandemic. In 2020, Cohen was mentioned as a potential pick for Health and Human Services Secretary under President-elect Joe Biden.

Cohen has navigated the political divide over Medicaid in North Carolina, with Democratic Governor Cooper wanting to expand it under the Affordable Care Act and the Republican-majority North Carolina State Legislature opposing such measures. She helped lead North Carolina through a transition from free-for-service Medicaid to a model contracted by the state with private insurance companies that are paid pre-determined rates to provide health services. Cohen spearheaded Healthy Opportunities, an initiative testing the impact of providing high-need Medicaid enrollees with housing, food, transportation, and interpersonal safety interventions with the goal of improving public health and reducing costs. The initiative was funded with $650 million from state and federal Medicaid, authorized by the Centers for Medicare and Medicaid Services. She implemented the Opioid Action Plan, which uses $45.5 million in grant funding to fight opioid misuse in the state. The plan also updated the Controlled Substance Reporting System, helping doctors identify patients at risk of misusing opioids. Cohen's plan led to a decline in overdose deaths in North Carolina for the first time in over a decade. She led the Early Childhood Action Plan, focusing on improving health conditions of children from birth to age eight.  

On September 14, 2017, she was a guest speaker at a luncheon hosted by the League of Women Voters at North Carolina State University.

In 2019 she criticized the North Carolina House of Representatives' proposed budget for 2019–2021, arguing that it harms North Carolinians by making massive cuts to the Department of Health and Human Services, potentially impacting "everything from health inspections of restaurants to the safety of drinking water to child protective services." In February 2019 Modern Healthcare named Cohen as one of the Top 25 Women Leaders in Healthcare. She was honored with the "Top 50 in Digital Health" award by Rock Health.

Governor Cooper announced on November 30, 2021, that Cohen would leave office on January 1, 2022.

COVID-19 pandemic 
Cohen has stressed the need for North Carolinians to wear face masks, practice social distancing, and wash their hands in order to prevent the spread of COVID-19.
In March 2020 she sent a letter to Marcia Lee Kelly, president of the 2020 Republican National Convention, asking for detailed plans on how the convention would operate during the COVID-19 pandemic after President Donald Trump published a series of tweets threatening to pull the convention out of North Carolina. In June 2020 she met virtually with members of the North Carolina House of Representatives' Health Committee to address concerns regarding the pandemic. Cohen announced the creation of up to three hundred testing sites in North Carolina, active through July, and requested more supplies from the federal government. She also met with U.S. Health and Human Services Secretary Alex Azar to discuss the need for more chemical reagents. On June 30, 2020 Cohen announced that her department would partner with Omnicare, a company owned by CVS Health, to administer tests to 36,000 nursing home residents and 25,000 nursing home employees in over 400 locations.

In the beginning of July, Cohen warned of people becoming desensitized to the data being collected about COVID-19. She held a media briefing on July 16, 2020, to address virus testing in North Carolina, after the state reached 96,426 confirmed cases of COVID-19 and 1,588 deaths related to the virus. She stated that she had concerns about teacher safety were schools to re-open amidst the pandemic, but was confident in studies showing that the virus has minimal health consequences on younger children, saying that schools "have not played a significant role in the spreading of COVID-19." She reportedly met with William L. Roper, president of the University of North Carolina, to discuss how to resume in-person instruction for students at North Carolina's public colleges and universities. Earlier that month, during a press conference, she had called the virus a "serious threat". She warned of the state possibly returning to a stay-at-home order. She had also linked North Carolina's rise in cases with the reopening of the state. Cohen indicated that there would be a test surge in areas with troubling metrics including the counties of Alamance, Durham, Duplin, Forsyth, Lee, Johnston, Mecklenburg, and Wake.

Personal life 
Cohen is married to Samuel Cohen, a health care regulatory attorney. They met in Boston, where she was finishing up her residency in internal medicine and he was attending law school. They have two daughters and live in North Ridge Country Club in northern Raleigh.

She is Jewish, and was honored by the Jewish Federation of Raleigh-Cary's Lions of Judah in 2018 for her contributions to the community.

References 

American health officials
American internists
Cornell University alumni
Harvard School of Public Health alumni
Jewish American government officials
Jewish American people in North Carolina politics
Living people
North Carolina Democrats
Obama administration personnel
People from Hempstead (town), New York
State cabinet secretaries of North Carolina
United States Department of Health and Human Services officials
United States Department of Veterans Affairs officials
Women in North Carolina politics
University of North Carolina at Chapel Hill faculty
Yale School of Medicine alumni
Year of birth missing (living people)
Members of the National Academy of Medicine
Women internists
21st-century American women physicians
21st-century American physicians